Archeparchy of Tyre may refer to:
 Melkite Greek Catholic Archeparchy of Tyre
 Maronite Catholic Archeparchy of Tyre